The Northrop Grumman Bat is a medium-altitude unmanned air vehicle originally developed for use by the United States Armed Forces. Designed primarily as an intelligence "ISR" gathering tool, the Bat features  payload capacity that is unmatched in a  wing span.

Northrop Grumman received design and marketing rights from Swift Engineering to the Killer Bee, renamed the Bat in April 2009.

The Bat UAS was redeveloped to increase payload carrying capacity and extend range.

On August 12, 2011, Northrop Grumman won a $26m contract for Sand Dragon B Tier II UAVs able to detect IEDs and roadside bombs.

Characteristics
 The Bat UAS System is packaged for transport into two major assemblies: Launch/Recovery and Air Vehicle/GCS.
 Transportable on MV-22, HUMVEE, C-130 and by helicopter
 Bat UAVs incorporate COTS payloads for reduced costs and ease of maintenance.
 Automatic Recovery is programmed and controlled via autonomous computer and differential GPS using a portable net system.
 Catapult launcher functions are controlled and monitored by GCS software.

The blended wings merge with the fuselage into a single airfoil to reduce aerodynamic drag, improve fuel economy and increase flight endurance. Made largely of composites, including epoxy/carbon fiber and fiberglass, the airfoil is rigid, providing a structural efficiency which reduces materials and manufacturing costs. With net hooks in the nose and a rear pusher propeller, the craft lands in a mobile retrieval net.

The current Hirth engine with its five-bladed propeller provides a flight time of up to 18 hours. The Bat is designed to have a lower than average visual and radar cross-section profile. A heavy-fuel engine version is also available.

The payload capabilities include still image and real-time video cameras, EO/IR and SAR sensors, Kestrel MTI, laser range finders, laser designators, infrared cameras, communication relays, IED detection, radar jamming EW, chemical and biological detection systems, psy ops, and flare dispensers.

Uses
The Bat UAS can carry numerous types of payloads for collecting intelligence, including still image and real time video cameras, EO/IR and SAR sensors, laser range finders, laser designators, Infra-Red cameras, communications relay equipment, chemical, biological, and IED detection systems and flare dispensers. The Bat series is offered for surveillance of civil disturbances, borders, pipe- and power-lines, as well as meteorology.

Specifications (Bat UAS)

See also
 Lockheed Martin RQ-170 Sentinel
 Swift Engineering
 Mikoyan Skat
 Sukhoi Okhotnik

References

External links

Bat
2000s United States military reconnaissance aircraft
Unmanned aerial vehicles of the United States
Single-engined pusher aircraft
Flying wings
Aircraft first flown in 2006